Leonardo Grosso (born 1 April 1983) is an Argentine politician who has been a member of the Argentine Chamber of Deputies for Buenos Aires Province since 2011. Grosso is a member and one of the most prominent faces of the Evita Movement, a peronist political and social organization.

Early life and education
Grosso was born on 1 April 1983 in San Martín, a city in the Greater Buenos Aires conurbation. He started his political activism in the JP Evita, the Evita Movement's youth wing, in 2005. He is currently studying political science at the National University of General San Martín (UNSAM).

Political career
Grosso was first elected to the Chamber of Deputies in 2011 in the Front for Victory list in Buenos Aires Province, in which he was the 20th candidate. He was elected and sat in the Front for Victory bloc, aligned with the government of then-president Cristina Fernández de Kirchner. He was re-elected in 2015, this time placing 13th in the FPV list.

Ahead of the 2017 legislative election, Grosso and the rest of the Evita Movement broke ranks with the FPV and instead backed the unsuccessful senatorial candidacy of former Interior Minister Florencio Randazzo; in the Chamber of Deputies, the Evita Movement formed the Peronism for Victory bloc, which later formed part of the Red por Argentina parliamentary group alongside, among others, deputies Felipe Solá and Victoria Donda.

Ahead of the 2019 general election, the Evita Movement joined the Frente de Todos (FDT) to back the presidential candidacy of Alberto Fernández; Grosso was 3rd in the FDT deputies list in Buenos Aires Province and was easily re-elected.

Personal life
In 2019 Grosso married his long-term partner, Guillermo Castro, becoming one of the few members of the Argentine National Congress to marry a same-sex partner under the 2010 same-sex marriage law, after Analuz Carol and Osvaldo López. Grosso has stated that he identifies as marica.

Grosso is a vocal supporter of the legalization of abortion in Argentina, and voted in favor of the 2018 Voluntary Termination of Pregnancy Bill during its treatment by the Chamber of Deputies.

Electoral history

References

External links

Official website (in Spanish)

1983 births
Living people
Members of the Argentine Chamber of Deputies elected in Buenos Aires Province
People from San Martín, Buenos Aires
LGBT legislators
Argentine LGBT politicians
Argentine gay men
Gay politicians